The  was a group of around 305 young teenage samurai of the Aizu Domain, who fought in the Boshin War (1868–1869) on the side of the Tokugawa shogunate.

History
The Byakkotai was part of Aizu's four-unit military, formed in April 1868 in the domain's drive to finalize its military modernization, in the wake of the Battle of Toba–Fushimi. The other three units were the Genbutai (Black Tortoise Unit), the Seiryūtai (Azure Dragon Unit), and the Suzakutai (Vermilion Bird Unit). Each of the four was named after the protecting gods of compass directions. Byakkotai was meant to be a reserve unit, as it was composed of the young, 16- to 17-year-old sons of Aizu samurai. It was subdivided further, along the lines of rank within the domain's samurai population: two squads were from the upper (shichū) rank, two from the middle rank (yoriai), and two from the lowest (ashigaru). Twenty of the members of the 2nd shichū squad, cut off from the rest of their unit in the wake of the Battle of Tonoguchihara, retreated to Iimori Hill, which overlooked the castle town. From there, they saw what they thought was the castle on fire, and committed seppuku (with one failed attempt) in desperation, believing their lord and families dead. However these 20 Byakkotai members were mistaken in their assessment of defeat, as the castle defenses had not actually been breached; the castle town surrounding the inner citadel was aflame. As the majority of the town was between Iimori Hill and the castle, the boys saw the rising smoke and assumed that the castle itself had fallen.

The 19 Byakkotai members who committed suicide were the following:

Adachi Tōzaburō
Ishiyama Toranosuke
Shinoda Gisaburō (acting commander)
Nagase Yūji
Mase Genshichirō
Aruga Orinosuke
Itō Teijirō
Suzuki Genkichi
Nishikawa Shōtarō
Yanase Katsusaburō
Ikegami Shintarō
Itō Toshihiko
Tsuda Sutezō
Nomura Komashirō
Yanase Takeji
Ishida Wasuke
Ibuka Shigetarō
Tsugawa Kiyomi
Hayashi Yasoji

The sole survivor, Iinuma Sadakichi, attempted suicide but was unsuccessful. He was saved by a local peasant. After the war, he moved to the nearby city of Sendai, and lived there until his death. He also served as an officer in the army (retiring with the rank of captain) and as an official of the local post office in Sendai.

After the war, their bodies remained exposed to the elements until permission was finally granted by the imperial government to bury them. A memorial was later erected at Iimori Hill, and all 20 of the Byakkotai members named above are buried there. A stone bearing a poem by Matsudaira Katamori also stands at the site:

幾人の　涙は石にそそぐとも　その名は世々に　朽じとぞ思ふ

Ikutari no namida wa ishi ni sosogu tomo sono na wa yoyo ni kuchiji to zo omou

"No matter how many people wash the stones with their tears, these names will never vanish from the world."

The rest of the Byakkotai continued to fight over the course of the Battle of Aizu, with many of the members contributing to the defense of the castle. Many Byakkotai members survived the war. Two of them who went on to prominent roles during the Meiji Era were the physicist and historian Dr Yamakawa Kenjirō and the Imperial Japanese Navy admiral Dewa Shigetō.

European fascism and the Byakkotai

The Italian fascist dictator Benito Mussolini heard of the story of the Byakkotai members who committed suicide, and was deeply impressed by their loyalty to their lord. In 1928, he donated a column from Pompeii to be erected by the graves at Iimori Hill; this column remains there to the present day.    Nazi Germany also erected a monument showing their approval of the Byakkotai. After the surrender of Japan at the end of World War II, the U.S. Army removed the Nazi symbol from the German monument and replaced it with an iron cross.

Depictions in media

The Byakkotai have been the topic of many plays, books, films, and TV series. One notable TV depiction was produced in 1986; another, more recently, was the 2007 TV drama, which starred Yamashita Tomohisa, Tanaka Koki and Fujigaya Taisuke. Yamashita portrayed another Byakkotai survivor, Sakai Mineji.

The Byakkotai are featured as a unit exclusive to the Aizu clan in Total War: Shogun 2: Fall of the Samurai.

Gallery

See also 
Aizuwakamatsu Castle
 Nihonmatsu Shonentai
 Fukushima Museum

Notes

References
Nakamura Akihiko (2001). Byakkotai. Tokyo: Bunshun-shinsho.
Noguchi Shin'ichi (2005). Aizu-han. Tokyo: Gendai Shokan.

External links

 Homepage of the Byakkotai Museum in Aizu

People of the Boshin War
Culture in Fukushima Prefecture
Japanese warriors
Meiji Restoration
Seppuku from Meiji period to present
Suicides by sharp instrument in Japan